Hathaway Scholarships are scholarships designed to provide an incentive for Wyoming students to prepare for and pursue postsecondary education within the State of Wyoming. The program, which was named in honor of former Wyoming Governor and U.S. Secretary of the Interior Stanley K. Hathaway, consists merit and need-based awards. The origins of the scholarship relate to Hathaway's 1974 creation of the Wyoming Permanent Mineral Trust Fund. 

Hathaway Merit Scholarships became available for eligible recipients beginning with the class of 2006 for the 2006 fall semester  and as of 2018 provided more than 5,000 students with $16m in financial aid. All community colleges as well as the University of Wyoming accept the scholarship.

References

External links
 hathawayscholarship.org

Scholarships in the United States
Education in Wyoming
2006 establishments in Wyoming